Angre may refer to:

 Angre, Honnelles, Hainaut, Belgium
 Chandroji Angre, Indian politician
 Kanhoji Angre (1669–1729), Indian admiral of the Maratha Navy
 Ravindranath Angre (born 1956), Indian police officer
 Sambhaji Angre (1920–2008), Indian politician

See also
 Anger (disambiguation)
 Angres, Pas-de-Calais department, France
 Robert Aunger (fl. 1390s), English Politician